Nail Renadovich Umyarov (born 27 June 2000) is a Russian football player of Tatar descent who plays for Spartak Moscow as a defensive midfielder.

Club career
Umyarov made his debut in the Russian Professional Football League for Chertanovo Moscow on 3 August 2017 in a game against Dynamo-2 Saint Petersburg.

On 8 January 2019, FC Spartak Moscow officially announced that Umyarov signed the contract with the club.

He made his Russian Premier League debut for Spartak on 17 March 2019 in a game against FC Zenit Saint Petersburg.

On 27 October 2021, he extended his contract with Spartak until the end of the 2025–26 season.

Honours
Spartak Moscow
Russian Cup: 2021–22

Career statistics

References

External links
 
 Profile by Russian Professional Football League
 

2000 births
People from Syzran
Sportspeople from Samara Oblast
Tatar people of Russia
Living people
Russian footballers
Russia youth international footballers
Russia under-21 international footballers
Association football midfielders
FC Chertanovo Moscow players
FC Spartak-2 Moscow players
FC Spartak Moscow players
Russian Premier League players
Russian First League players
Russian Second League players